WSME (1120 AM) is an Eastern North Carolina radio station broadcasting an oldies format. The station is licensed to the town of Camp Lejeune, North Carolina, serving the Jacksonville area. The station is licensed to B&M Broadcasting LLC. WSME also simulcasts via an FM translator (W246CJ), at 97.1 FM.

"Freedom 97.1 and 1120", as the station is known, features pop music from the 1960s and 1970s, including rock and roll, soul, beach music and other classic hits of the era.  The station was originally licensed to broadcast on 1580 AM.

External links
FCC History Cards for WSME

SME
1980 establishments in North Carolina
SME